Lynne Barasch is an American children's book illustrator and author.

Work 
Lynne Barasch was born in New York City and grew up in Woodmere, New York. She studied at Rhode Island School of Design for one year. Barasch holds a BFA from Parsons School of Design.

Radio Rescue was a 2001 ALA Notable Children's Book for Younger Readers. Hiromi's Hands received an Honorable Mention from the 2008 Asian/Pacific American Awards for Literature.

She currently lives in New York City with her husband.

Publications 
She is the author of several children's books: 
 1992 – Rodney's Inside Story
 1993 – A Winter Walk
 1998 - Old Friends
 2000 – Radio Rescue
 2001 – The Reluctant Flower Girl
 2004 – Knockin' On Wood: Starring Peg Leg Bates
 2004 - A Country House 
 2005 – Ask Albert Einstein
 2007 – Hiromi's Hands
 2008 – Owney, the Mail-Pouch Pooch
 2009 – First Come the Zebra

References

External links
 
 

American children's book illustrators
American children's writers
Rhode Island School of Design alumni
Parsons School of Design alumni
People from Woodmere, New York
Year of birth missing (living people)
Living people
Writers from New York City